Michael Lane is an English politician and former Royal Navy Commodore, and the former Police and Crime Commissioner for Hampshire, representing the Conservative Party. He was elected to the post on 5 May 2016, succeeding the previous incumbent, Simon Hayes. Lane served as a councillor with Gosport Borough Council from 2010 to 2014.

References

Year of birth missing (living people)
Living people
Royal Navy officers
Councillors in Hampshire
Police and crime commissioners in England
Conservative Party (UK) councillors
Conservative Party police and crime commissioners